The 52nd World Rowing Junior Championships took place from 8 to 12 August 2018 at the Labe Aréna Račice in Račice, Czech Republic.

Medal summary

Men's events

Women's events

Medal table

See also
 2018 World Rowing Championships
 2018 World Rowing U23 Championships

References

External links
Official website 
WorldRowing website

2018
2018 in Czech sport
International sports competitions hosted by the Czech Republic
Rowing competitions in the Czech Republic
2018 in rowing
August 2018 sports events in Europe